The 1971 South Dakota Coyotes football team was an American football team that represented the University of South Dakota in the North Central Conference (NCC) during the 1971 NCAA College Division football season. In its sixth season under head coach Joe Salem, the team compiled a 3–7 record (3–3 against NCC opponents), tied for fourth place out of seven teams in the NCC, and was outscored by a total of 191 to 172. The team played its home games at Inman Field in Vermillion, South Dakota.

Schedule

References

South Dakota
South Dakota Coyotes football seasons
South Dakota Coyotes football